Sorcha Groundsell (born 15 February 1998) is a Scottish actress. She starred in the Netflix series The Innocents (2018) and the independent film Far From the Apple Tree (2018).

Early life
Her father was a graphic designer, and her mother worked in marketing. Groundsell grew up in Ness on the Isle of Lewis in the Outer Hebrides until she was nine. A fluent Gaelic speaker, she attended the Glasgow Gaelic School upon moving to the city. She took drama classes at the Citizens Theatre and later the Royal Conservatoire of Scotland. She left school at 16 to pursue acting as career and moved to London at 18.

Career
In 2015, Groundsell made her feature film and stage debuts as Sarah in Iona and Amy in Stain at the Edinburgh Fringe Festival respectively. She received an RTS Award nomination for her role in Sleeping Lions. The following year, she starred as Jane Muncie in the ITV true crime miniseries In Plain Sight.

Groundsell played Elizabeth Smith in the first series of the BBC Three thriller Clique. In 2018, Groundsell starred in leading fantasy roles in the Netflix series The Innocents as well as the independent film Far From the Apple Tree. She appeared in the 2019 Yard Theatre production of The Crucible, the two-parter Thanks for the Memories, made a guest appearance in Grantchester, and had a recurring role in the BritBox adaptation of Irvine Welsh's Crime.

In 2022, Groundsell appeared in series three of the BBC One and HBO adaptation of His Dark Materials and the seventh series of Shetland, also on BBC One.

Filmography

Film

Television

Web

Video games

Stage

Awards and nominations

References

External links
 

Living people
1998 births
21st-century Scottish actresses
Actresses from Glasgow
People from the Isle of Lewis